Nico Manelius (born March 12, 1991) is a professional ice hockey defender. He currently plays for Jokerit in SM-liiga.

References
http://www.sm-liiga.fi/pelaajat/09-10/jokerit/manelius-nico.html

External links

1991 births
Living people
Jokerit players
Sportspeople from Vantaa
Lahti Pelicans players
Finnish ice hockey defencemen